Christopher Louis (born 9 July 1969) is an English international speedway motorcycle rider who rode for the Ipswich Witches and Hackney Kestrels. He is the son of former Great Britain International John Louis.

Career
Louis is former schoolboy grasstrack champion. He started his professional career at Hackney before moving to Ipswich in 1989 where he rode to the end of his riding career. He has missed a couple of seasons due to injury.

Chris Louis made history in 1993 when he became the first son of a former World Finalist to also qualify for the World Final when he finished in third place in Pocking, Germany. Louis tied with former champion Hans Nielsen of Denmark in 11 points, only 1 point behind winner Sam Ermolenko of the United States. In a run-off to decide overall second place, Nielsen defeated Chris Louis who had to settle for third in his World Final debut.

Louis also qualified for the 1994 World Final in Vojens, Denmark but was unable to repeat his 1993 form and finished a disappointing 12th scoring only six points.

Chris Louis qualified for the new Speedway Grand Prix series which replaced the former World Final in 1995. He finished a career best 7th in the 1995 SGP with a best finish of third in Poland. He continued to take part in the SGP series as a regular rider until 2000, with his best finishes being second placings in the 1998 Danish and Swedish GP's and the 1999 British GP. He rode in selected events in 2001 before making his last appearance as wild card in 2004.

During his career, Chris won trophies in the UK, Poland, Sweden and Germany, and in 1998 and 2000 he followed his father's footsteps by becoming British Speedway Champion (John Louis won in 1975).

Louis maintained his relationship with Ipswich becoming both their team manager and promoter but he stepped down as team manager in 2014. He remains as promoter leading into the SGB Premiership 2023 season.

Personal
Louis is married to Julie and the couple have two daughters: Hannah and Freya Louis.

World Final Appearances
 1993 –  Pocking, Rottalstadion – 3rd – 11pts + 2pts
 1994 –  Vojens, Speedway Center – 12th – 6pts

Speedway Grand Prix results

References

1969 births
Living people
British speedway riders
English motorcycle racers
Sportspeople from Ipswich
British Speedway Championship winners
Ipswich Witches riders